Persis Khambatta (2 October 1948 – 18 August 1998) was an Indian model and actress who is best remembered for playing Lieutenant Ilia in the feature film Star Trek: The Motion Picture (1979).

Biography

Early life and family
Persis Khambatta was born in Bombay to a middle-class Parsi family. Her father left her family when she was two years old. She first gained fame when a set of her pictures casually taken by a well-known Bombay photographer was used for a successful campaign for a popular soap brand. This eventually led to her becoming a model. She entered and won the Femina Miss India contest in 1965. She was the second winner of Femina Miss India and third Indian woman to participate in the Miss Universe pageant. At the Femina Miss India contest, she also won the Miss Photogenic award.

Modelling and acting career

Khambatta's first appearance at the age of 13 in advertisements for the soap brand Rexona set her on her way to becoming a popular model. At the age of 16, as Femina Miss India, Khambatta entered Miss Universe 1965 in July of that year, dressed in off-the-rack clothes she bought at the last minute. She became a model for companies such as Air India, Revlon, and Garden Vareli.

Khambatta made her Bollywood début in director K. A. Abbas's Bambai Raat Ki Bahon Mein (1968), playing cabaret singer Lily who croons the film's title track. She had small roles in Conduct Unbecoming and The Wilby Conspiracy (both 1975). She went on to have a brief movie career that included the role for which she is most recognized, the bald Deltan navigator Lieutenant Ilia, in Star Trek: The Motion Picture (1979). She shaved her head for the role. She was originally signed to play the role for five years, as the intention was to create a new Star Trek television series. Khambatta said that she was thrilled when the project became a movie instead, because it would have greater impact on her career, but she also recognised that she had lost five years' work. Khambatta became the first Indian citizen to present an Academy Award in 1980. She was nominated for the Saturn Award for Best Actress for her role in Star Trek. This led to roles in Nighthawks (1981), Megaforce (1982), Warrior of the Lost World (1983), and She-Wolves of the Wasteland (1988). She was considered for the title role in the James Bond film Octopussy (1983), but was passed over in favor of Maud Adams.

Co-star Stephen Collins described Khambatta in Star Trek as "a very gentle person, who I think was a little overwhelmed by Hollywood". In 1980, she was seriously injured in a car crash in West Germany, which left a huge scar on her head. In 1983, she underwent coronary artery bypass surgery. She returned to Bombay in 1985, and appeared in the 1986 Hindi movie Shingora opposite Aditya Pancholi and Marc Zuber. Soon after, Khambatta returned to Hollywood and performed in guest roles on various television series such as Mike Hammer and MacGyver. In 1997, she wrote and published a coffee table book, Pride of India, which featured several former Miss India winners. The book was dedicated to Mother Teresa, and part of the royalties went to the Missionaries of Charity. Her final appearance in an acting role was that of Chair of the Congress of Nations in the 1993 pilot episode of Lois & Clark: The New Adventures of Superman.

Personal life and death
Khambatta was first married to actor Cliff Taylor. In May 1989 she married Rui Saldanha, a former field hockey player who represented Great Britain at the 1972 Summer Olympics. The ceremony took place at the Polk County Courthouse in Des Moines, Iowa, where Saldanha worked as a representative of the New York Life Insurance Company.

Khambatta was a chain smoker. In 1998, she was taken to the Marine Hospital in south Mumbai, complaining of chest pains, and she died of a massive heart attack on 18 August 1998 at the age of 49. Her funeral was held in Mumbai the following day.

Filmography

Film

Television

References

References
 The Globe: 10 November 1998
 Beverly Hills [213] magazine: November 1998
 New York Post: 20 October 1998

External links
 
 
 

1948 births
1998 deaths
Parsi people
Female models from Mumbai
Actresses from Mumbai
Parsi people from Mumbai
Femina Miss India winners
Indian film actresses
Indian television actresses
Miss Universe 1965 contestants
20th-century Indian actresses